"Soul on Ice" is the second single released from Ras Kass' debut album, Soul on Ice. Produced by Bird, "Soul on Ice" became Ras Kass' most successful single chartwise, gaining the most success on the Hot Rap Singles chart, where it peaked at 22. Diamond D of D.I.T.C. remixed the song.

Single track listing
"Soul on Ice Remix" (Clean)- 4:53
"Soul on Ice Remix" (Explicit)- 4:19
"Soul on Ice Remix" (Instrumental)- 4:18
"Marinatin'" (Clean)- 4:05
"Marinatin'" (Explicit)- 4:05
"Marinatin'" (Instrumental)- 4:05

Charts

References

1996 singles
Ras Kass songs
1996 songs
Priority Records singles